The 1878 Nova Scotia general election was held on 17 September 1878 to elect members of the 27th House of Assembly of the Province of Nova Scotia, Canada. It was won by the Liberal-Conservative Party.

Results

Results by party

Retiring incumbents
Independent/Other
Hiram Black, Cumberland
Charles Boudroit, Richmond
John J. McKinnon, Inverness
John B. North, Kings

Liberal
Charles Henry Davison, Lunenburg
Edward Farrell, Halifax
Charles M. Franchville, Guysborough
John A. Fraser, Victoria
Thomas Johnston, Shelburne
John Lovitt, Yarmouth
Daniel MacDonald, Antigonish
David McCurdy, Victoria

Liberal-Conservative
William Henry Allison, Hants
Hugh J. Cameron, Pictou
Avard Longley, Annapolis
Murdoch McRae, Richmond
Alfred Putnam, Hants
Douglas Benjamin Woodworth, Kings

Nominated candidates
1878 Nova Scotia Provincial Election

Legend
bold denotes party leader
† denotes an incumbent who is not running for re-election or was defeated in nomination contest

Valley

|-
| rowspan="2"|Annapolis	
|
|O. M. Taylor1,23524.49%
||
|William Botsford Troop1,35026.77%	
|
|
||
|William Botsford Troop
|-	
|
|E. Bent1,16323.06%
||
|Caleb Shaffner1,29525.68%	
|
|
||
|Avard Longley†
|-
| rowspan="3"|Digby
|
|Urbine Doucette73820.20%
|rowspan=2 |
|rowspan=2|Benjamin Van Blarcom83322.80%
|rowspan=2|
|rowspan=2|Colin Campbell72519.85%
|rowspan=2 |
|rowspan=2|Colin Campbell
|-	
|
|John S. McNeill52714.43%
|-
||
|Henri M. Robicheau83022.72%
|
|
|
|
||
|Henri M. Robicheau
|-
| rowspan="2"|Hants
||
|Thomas Barlow Smith1,50725.58%
|
|F. S. Creelman1,46524.87%	
|
|
||
|William Henry Allison†
|-	
|
|William Dawson Laurence1,29822.03%
||
|Nathaniel Spence1,62127.52%
|
|
||
|Alfred Putnam†
|-
| rowspan="2"|Kings	
|
|G. W. Fisher1,41424.87%
||
|William C. Bill1,60128.16%	
|
|
||
|Douglas Benjamin Woodworth†
|-	
|
|E. A. Forsyth1,14320.11%
||
|James S. MacDonald1,52726.86%	
|
|
||
|John B. North†
|-
|}

South Shore

|-
| rowspan="2"|Lunenburg	
|
|James Daniel Eisenhauer1,26321.98%
||
|Charles A. Smith1,71929.91%	
|
|
||
|James Daniel Eisenhauer
|-	
|
|F. B. Wade1,28622.38%
||
|Edward James1,47925.74%	
|
|
||
|Charles Henry Davison†
|-
| rowspan="3"|Queens	
|
|Samuel Freeman53121.33%
||
|Leander Ford60724.38%	
|
|
||
|Samuel Freeman
|-	
|
|Jason M. Mack50320.20%
|rowspan=2 |
|rowspan=2|James C. Bartling53421.45%	
|rowspan=2|
|rowspan=2|
|rowspan=2 |
|rowspan=2|Jason M. Mack
|-
|
|Albert M. Hemeon31512.65%
|-
| rowspan="2"|Shelburne	
|
|William F. MacCoy89222.92%
||
|Nathaniel Whitworth White1,14029.29%	
|
|
||
|Nathaniel Whitworth White
|-	
|
|M. Nickerson87122.38%
||
|Nehemiah McGray98925.41%	
|
|
||
|Thomas Johnston†
|-
| rowspan="3"|Yarmouth
||
|Albert Gayton1,08629.22%
|
|
|
|W. V. Brown47012.65%
||
|Albert Gayton
|-	
||
|Joseph Robbins Kinney1,00026.91%
|rowspan=2|
|rowspan=2|Bowman Corning66918.%	
|rowspan=2|
|rowspan=2|
|rowspan=2 |
|rowspan=2|John Lovitt†
|-
|
|A. S. Lent49113.21%
|-
|}

Fundy-Northeast

|-
| rowspan="2"|Colchester	
|
|C. N. Cummings1,40221.77%
||
|William Albert Patterson1,84628.66%	
|
|
||
|William Albert Patterson
|-	
|
|Fred Tupper1,30820.31%
||
|William Blair1,88529.27%	
|
|
||
|Vacant
|-
| rowspan="2"|Cumberland	
|
|William Oxley1,65725.78%
||
|Charles James Townshend1,79227.88%	
|
|
||
|Hiram Black†
|-	
|
|C. Lewis1,31120.40%
||
|Edward Vickery1,66725.94%	
|
|
||
|Edward Vickery
|-
|}

Halifax

|-
| rowspan="3"|Halifax	
|
|Philip Carteret Hill2,86615.76%
||
|Charles James MacDonald3,37518.55%	
|
|
||
|Philip Carteret Hill
|-	
|
|Donald Archibald2,72214.96%
||
|William D. Harrington3,35318.43%	
|
|
||
|Donald Archibald
|- 
|
|Michael Joseph Power2,73915.06%
||
|John Pugh3,13517.23%	
|
|
||
|Edward Farrell†
|-
|}

Central Nova

|-
| rowspan="2"|Antigonish	
|
|
||
|John Sparrow David ThompsonAcclamation	
|
|
||
|John Sparrow David Thompson
|-	
||
|Angus McGillivrayAcclamation
|
|	
|
|
||
|Daniel MacDonald†
|-
| rowspan="3"|Guysborough	
|
|D. C. Fraser59619.22%
||
|Joseph William Hadley80325.89%	
|
|
||
|Charles M. Franchville†
|-	
|
|Otto Schwartz Weeks50216.19%
|rowspan=2 |
|rowspan=2|Alexander N. McDonald69822.51%	
|rowspan=2|
|rowspan=2|
|rowspan=2 |
|rowspan=2|Otto Schwartz Weeks
|-
|
|H. R. Cunningham50216.19%
|-
| rowspan="3"|Pictou	
|
|George Murray2,34915.85%
||
|Simon Hugh Holmes2,75218.57%	
|
|
||
|Simon Hugh Holmes
|-	
|
|John D. McLeod2,25015.18%
||
|Adam Carr Bell2,69418.18%	
|
|
||
|Hugh J. Cameron†
|-
|
|Robert McNeil2,18314.73%
||
|Alexander MacKay2,59217.49%	
|
|
||
|Alexander MacKay
|-
|}

Cape Breton

|-
| rowspan="5"|Cape Breton	
|rowspan=3|
|rowspan=3|Alonzo J. White93016.82%
||
|Hector Francis McDougall1,02718.57%
|rowspan=3|
|rowspan=3|
|rowspan=3 |
|rowspan=3|Alonzo J. White
|-	
|
|J. H. Hearn71612.95%
|-
|
|Joseph McVarish3716.71%
|-
|rowspan=2|
|rowspan=2|D. McKenzie61411.10%
||
|Ebenezer Tilton Moseley1,52327.54%
|rowspan=2|
|rowspan=2|
|rowspan=2 |
|rowspan=2|Ebenezer Tilton Moseley
|-
|
|Michael McKinnon3496.31%
|-
| rowspan="2"|Inverness
||
|Duncan J. Campbell1,65027.36%
|
|D. Gillies1,39323.10%
|
|
||
|Duncan J. Campbell
|-	
|
|John McKinnon1,44023.88%	
||
|Alexander Campbell1,54825.67%	
|
|
||
|John J. McKinnon†
|-
| rowspan="2"|Richmond
||
|Isidore LeBlanc59926.11%
|
|Edward Gagnon55124.02%
|
|
||
|Charles Boudroit†
|-	
|
|Joseph Matheson50121.84%	
||
|Alexander McCuish64328.03%
|
|
||
|Murdoch McRae†
|-
| rowspan="2"|Victoria
||
|William F. McCurdy59425.36%
|
|J. S. McLean36815.71%	
|
|William Kidston1938.24%
||
|David McCurdy†
|-	
|
|John Ross58024.77%
||
|John Angus Morrison60725.92%
|
|
||
|John A. Fraser†
|-
|}

References

1878
1878 elections in Canada
1878 in Nova Scotia
September 1878 events